Zonitoides jaccetanicus is a species of small, air-breathing land snail, a terrestrial pulmonate gastropod mollusk in the family Gastrodontidae.

Distribution 
Zonitoides jaccetanicus is endemic to Montserrat mountain near Barcelona, Catalonia, Spain. It is a  rare species, possibly endemic to Catalonia.  The species has declined due to construction activities in the growing city of Barcelona.

Description 
The shell is evenly horny-brownish, fragile and transparent, finely striated on the upper side, nearly smooth on the lower side. The shell has 5 weakly convex whorls with pronounced suture. The upper side is flattened. Lower side is convex. The last whorl is not much wider than penultimate whorl. The aperture is oblique. The apertural margin is straight. Umbilicus is relatively narrow.

The width of the shell is 4–5 mm. The height of the shell is 2.6-3.4 mm.

The shell is very much like that of Zonitoides arboreus, but slightly larger. There are however anatomical differences between the two species.

References
This article incorporates public domain text from the reference.

Gastrodontidae
Gastropods described in 1870
Taxonomy articles created by Polbot